Las Cachas Airport  is an airstrip serving the hamlet of Cangrejera in La Libertad Department, El Salvador.

See also

Transport in El Salvador
List of airports in El Salvador

References

External links
 OurAirports - Las Cachas
 OpenStreetMap - Las Cachas
 Las Cachas

Airports in El Salvador